Drumleaning is a hamlet in Cumbria, England. It is located 4 miles south of Drumburgh on a low ridge near the Wampool.

References

Hamlets in Cumbria
Allerdale